Victor Rice (born April 17, 1967) is an American musician, record producer and mix engineer from New York City. Raised in Huntington, New York, Rice attended the Manhattan School of Music and began his professional career in the late 1980s during ska music’s so-called third wave as both a bassist and producer.  In the late 1990s he became a composer and sound designer for television.  In 2002, Rice moved to Brazil and although he continued working as a producer, performer and sound designer, he shifted his focus and became renowned as a mix engineer, working with a variety of local groups representing a number of different genres.

Ska and reggae
Rice began playing ska music in 1988 as a bass player with The Scofflaws, one of the most important ska bands of the third wave era.  In the early and mid-1990s, he emerged as a central figure in New York’s ska scene, both as a performer (Scofflaws, Stubborn All-Stars, New York Ska Jazz Ensemble) and a producer, (The Pietasters, The Slackers, The Adjusters, Skavoovie and the Epitones and others) and gained notoriety for having worked with many of the bands on the influential Moon Ska record label. In 1996, Rice began experimenting with dub music, largely at Version City, the recording studio Jeff "King Django" Baker founded on East Third Street in Manhattan’s Lower East Side for his label, Stubborn Records. The approach to music at Version City was completely analog and novel, in that recordings were largely collaborative and community oriented.  This allowed Rice to explore and develop his dub technique with the large “Version City Rockers” stable of musicians, alongside musician/producers like “Agent” Jay Nugent. Rice’s first solo record, At Version City, was recorded completely at the Version City studio and released in 1999.

In the 2000s, Rice continued to play bass on and produce recordings for artists like Vic Ruggiero, Rocker T and Crazy Baldhead.  He also continued to perform with the Victor Rice Octet, a band that performs his own ska and reggae compositions, and as the Strikkly Vikkly Dubsystem, a solo act in which Rice mixes dub live on stage using an analog reel-to-reel tape machine and traditional signal processing effects.  Although influenced by important foundational artists such as King Tubby and Augustus Pablo, Rice has a dub style that is distinct from that of the genre’s early pioneers.  While he employs many of the delay, echo, and reverb effects the original dub mixers used, he generally works with ska rhythms that are more quickly-paced than the traditional roots reggae rhythms found in Jamaican dub.

After moving to São Paulo, Brazil in 2002, Rice continued to produce reggae and ska music by a variety of international acts, including Firebug (Brazil), The Moon Invaders (Belgium), The Stingers ATX (USA), The Japonicans (Japan) and Chris Murray (Canada), Pitshú (a.k.a. Alberto Matondo Manzambi)/Cedric Brooks (Brazil&Angola/Jamaica) and Buford O’Sullivan (USA). In addition, from 2000-2009 Rice was a bassist and engineer with Easy Star Records and worked on many of their recordings, including Dub Side of the Moon, Radiodread, Easy Star’s Lonely Hearts Dub Band and Ticklah vs. Axelrod.  He also released his second solo album “In America” in 2003, an album of dub music so named because it was recorded in New York and finished in São Paulo.

Television
In 1999, Rice started working in television, at first with an apprenticeship with Cliff Schwarz Music, a post-production agency based in New York City.  There, he composed, mixed and worked on sound design for programs that aired on the Sci-Fi Channel and the USA Network.  He remained with Cliff Schwarz Music until 2004, when Rice became an audio engineer and mixer for Ultrabland, a digital production agency that offers editorial, design and music services for television brands. During his tenure with Ultrabland which lasted until 2008, he mixed and did post-production work on numerous promotional campaigns for companies like HBO (including its channel design), Showtime, the SyFy Channel, the USA Network and Nickelodeon.

Since 2011, he has been affiliated with Kittens Post, a media enterprise that provides original music for the SyFy Channel, Lifetime and A&E.

In television, Rice developed considerable skill with digital production techniques.  His experience in the medium (both in the US and Brazil), led him to invest more heavily in his reputation as a mix engineer.

In Brazil
After moving to São Paulo in 2002, Rice continued to perform, largely with the ska and reggae group Firebug BR, for whom he played bass, composed, produced.  Composed of notable artists from both the United States and Brazil, Firebug BR was signed to São Paulo-based Radiola Records, toured internationally and was considered an important group that improved the ska music scene in São Paulo.  Since 2004 he has also worked closely with Dubversão Sistema de Som, one of São Paulo's first roots reggae sound systems.

In Brazil, Rice continued to work as a producer and especially a mix engineer, at first with Estudio El Rocha (2002-2010), where he worked as a mix engineer (on both analog and digital systems) for a wide range of different artists.  Between 2002 and 2014, he also worked with Radiola Records, a record label based in São Paulo, where he engineered label productions and booked ska acts going to Brazil from North America.

During this period, Rice worked on projects by several international reggae and ska artists including The Slackers (USA), Dr. Ring-Ding (Germany), Proyecto Secreto (Belgium), Open Season (Switzerland), Two Tone Club (France), Glen Brown (Jamaica), Vieja Skina (Peru), PASO's Roots Rockers (Hungary), Dave Hillyard (USA) and Corey Harris (USA).  He also was the mix engineer on the live DVD Arena by the Skatalites.  However, he also became more fully exposed to a range of Brazilian musical styles, especially Brazilian MPB music.  He has since worked on a number of major projects for notable Brazilian artists, including Pitshú's Basoda (2008), Marcelo Camelo's DVD MTV ao Vivo (2010) and his album Toque Dela (2011), Lu Guedes’s album EletrOrquestra (2011), Peixoto & Machado El Esquisito Mundo Grátis (2012) Mallu Magalhães’s album Pitanga (2013), Wado’s album Vazio Tropical (2013), and Pedro Morais’s album Vertigem (2013) and Pitshú's 2 (2014).  Rice has also mixed several dozen singles for a number of Brazilian artists including Anelis Assumpção, Curumin, 12 Dolares Crew, Marietta Vital e Mairah Rocha, Coquetel Acapulco, Peixoto & Machado, Luisa Maita, Paulinho To, Pitshú & The Senior Allstars and others.

In 2008, Rice began building his own studio, Studio Copan.  It was completed in 2010 and is located in and named after the famous Edifício Copan building in São Paulo.

In 2010, Rice established Total Running Time, his own label and production house which offers recording artists a range of recording, mixing, mastering and sound design services.

Select discography (as a producer)
Scofflaws, The Scofflaws (1991)
Ska In Hi-Fi, The Scofflaws (1995)
Oolooloo, The Pietasters (1995)
Better Late Than Never, The Slackers (1996)
Dance With Me, The Bluebeats (1996)
Flip F'Real, The Articles (1997)
Ripe, Skavoovie and the Epitones (1997)
Version City Dub Clash', 'Version City Rockers
More Like This Than That, One Groovy Coconut (1998)
Nicer by the Hour, Rocker-T (1998)
Before The Revolution, The Adjusters (1998)
Gangster Politics, Gangster Politics (1998)
Age of Insects, Skandalous All-Stars (1998)
Cure For What Ales You, Skoidats (1999)
"(self-titled)", Firebug (2003)
Victor Rice in America, Victor Rice (2003)
Moon Invaders, The Moon Invaders (2003)
Breakin' Free, The Moon Invaders (2005)
Dubber Side of the Moon, Easy Star All-Stars (2010)
Blastoff, Danny Rebel & The KGB (2012)

Select discography (as a musician)
Scofflaws, The Scofflaws - Bass (1991)
World Upside Down, Glenn Branca - Bass (1992)
Ska in Hi-Fi, The Scofflaws - Bass (1995)
New York Ska-Jazz Ensemble, New York Ska-Jazz Ensemble - Bass (1995)
Open Season, Stubborn All-Stars - Bass, Bass (Electric), Vocals (background), String Bass (1995)
Sloan Wainwright, Sloan Wainwright - Bass, Bass (Electric) (1996)
Back with a New Batch, Stubborn All-Stars - String Bass (1997)
Low Blow, New York Ska-Jazz Ensemble - Bass (1997)
Give 'Em the Boot, Various Artists - Bass (1997)
Flip F'real, The Articles - Bass (1997)
Get This, New York Ska-Jazz Ensemble - Bass (1998)
Nicer By the Hour, Rocker-T & Version City... - Bass, Keyboards (1998)
Nex Music, Stubborn All-Stars - Organ, Bass (Electric), String Bass (1999)
At Version City, Victor Rice - Bass (1999)
Anti-Racist Action Benefit, Various Artists - Bass (1999)
Age of Insects, SKAndalous All-Stars - Bass, Percussion (1999)
Before the Revolution, The Adjusters - Bass, Guitar, Piano (1998)
Brendan& The Extenuating..., Brendan & The Extenuating... - Bass (1998)
Eat at Whitey's, Everlast - Bass (2000)
Brendan & The Extenuating..., Groovelily - Bass (2000)
Mi Selecta, Various Artists - Bass (2000)
Small Comfort, Cecilia Kirtland - Bass (2000)
In America, Victor Rice - Bass
Firebug, Firebug - Bass, Organ, Melodica (2004)
On the Move, Firebug - Bass, Organ, Melodica (2006)
Lover's Choice Babylove and the Van Dangoes -  Bass (2008)

References

External links
Victor Rice homepage and discography
Total Running Time website
Strikkly Vikkly website

1967 births
Living people
Record producers from New York (state)
American ska bass guitarists
20th-century American bass guitarists
Easy Star Records artists